The Tikal Futura, formally Gran Tikal Futura Torres Sol y Luna is a modern shopping and business complex and hotel in Guatemala City, Guatemala.

Information
It is located at Calzada Roosevelt 22–43, in Zone 11 of the city. At 75 metres, as of 2009 it is the fourth tallest building in Guatemala City. The building covers a floor space of 193,680 m2, has 20 floors and was completed in 1997. The building has 2 towers with offices, 12 cinemas, 160 stores, 27 restaurants, parking space for 1500 cars and also the Grand Tikal Futura Hotel.

See also
Joe Habie, former owner of the Tikal Futura

References

External links
Official website

Skyscrapers in Guatemala
Shopping malls in Guatemala
Hotels in Guatemala
Buildings and structures completed in 1997
Guatemala City
Skyscraper office buildings
Skyscraper hotels
Hotels established in 1997
Hotel buildings completed in 1997